Dubbeldam is a former village in the Dutch province of South Holland. It was located to the east of the city of Dordrecht. It is now a part of that city.

De Mijl was a separate municipality until 1857, when it became part of Dubbeldam.

Dubbeldam was a separate municipality until 1970, when it merged with Dordrecht.

References

Dordrecht
Former municipalities of South Holland